Hyptis crenata, the Brazilian mint, is a shrub species of flowering plant in the family Lamiaceae, native to Bolivia and Brazil. The genus Hyptis is commonly known as the bushmints. It is traditionally used for pain relief in Brazil.

References

crenata
Medicinal plants of South America
Flora of South America
Plants described in 1833